Loryma masamalis is a species of snout moth in the genus Loryma. It was described by Patrice J.A. Leraut in 2009 and is known from Madagascar (the type location is Antsalova).

References
 Loryma basalis African Moths

	

Moths described in 2009
Pyralini
Moths of Madagascar